Casalgrande is a comune (municipality) in the Province of Reggio Emilia in the Italian region Emilia-Romagna, located about  west of Bologna and about  southeast of Reggio Emilia.

The municipality of Casalgrande contains the frazioni (subdivisions, mainly villages and hamlets) Boglioni, Casalgrande Alto, Dinazzano, Salvaterra, San Donnino di Liguria, Sant'Antonino, Veggia and Villalunga.

Casalgrande borders the following municipalities: Castellarano, Formigine, Modena, Reggio Emilia, Rubiera, Sassuolo, Scandiano.

Demographic evolution

References

External links

 www.comune.casalgrande.re.it

Cities and towns in Emilia-Romagna